This is a list of Buffalo Bills players who were elected to the Pro Bowl.

The year indicates when the game was played, not the season that it followed.

2023–2020

2019–2010

2009–2000

1999–1990

 
Lists of Pro Bowl selections by National Football League team
Pro Bowl